The AFC Third Round of 2006 FIFA World Cup qualification began on 9 February 2005 and finished on 17 August 2005.

The top two countries in each group at the end of the stage qualified for the 2006 FIFA World Cup, while the third-placed teams entered a play-off to determine an entrant for the play-off with the fifth-placed CONCACAF team.

Format
The 8 group-winners from the previous round were split into two groups of four teams each – with all teams playing home and away against each of the other three teams in the group.

The top two teams in each group qualified for the 2006 FIFA World Cup.

Group 1

Group 2

Note: This match was used as backdrop for the 2006 Iranian film Offside.

Note: Since there were crowd troubles in the previous two North Korea's home matches, FIFA decided that the next one North Korea's home match be moved to a neutral venue (Thailand) and played behind closed doors.

References

External links
2006 FIFA World Cup qualification (AFC) at RSSSF.com
2006 FIFA World Cup qualification (AFC) at FIFA.com

3
2005 in Asian football
2004–05 in Saudi Arabian football
Qual
2004–05 in Kuwaiti football
2005–06 in Kuwaiti football
2004–05 in Iranian football
Qual
2004–05 in Bahraini football
2005–06 in Bahraini football
2005 in South Korean football
Qual
2005 in Uzbekistani football
2005 in North Korean football
2005 in Japanese football
Qual